Hiyodori, a Otori-class torpedo boat
 Hiyodori sōshi, a novel by Eiji Yoshikawa which has been made into a film
 Hiyodori sōshi, a 1928 film adaptation by Kichinosuke Hitomi
 Hiyodori sōshi, a 1933 film adaptation by Junzō Sone
 Hiyodori sōshi, a 1952 film adaptation by Tai Kato
 Hiyodori sōshi, a 1954 film adaptation by Kōkichi Uchide
Hiyodori: 13 Japanese Birds Pt. 9, an album by Merzbow